Wychie is a rural locality in the Western Downs Region, Queensland, Australia.

History 
Blackwood Provisional School opened on 19 July 1915 and closed on 27 October 1932. On 12 November 1932, the school was reopened and renamed Belah State School. It closed in 1962. In 1921, the school was on Inverai Road. In 1938, the school was at 1249 Ehlma Boundary Road.

Noola State School opened on 5 April 1923. Circa 1957, it renamed Noola Plains State School. It closed circa 1961. It was at 600 Brigalow Canaga Creek Road.

Wychie State School opened on 22 July 1946 and closed on 1962. It was on Wychie Road.

References

Further reading 

  — includes Blackwood State School, Belah State School, Ehlma State School, Haystack State School, Mulga State School, Noola State School, and Wychie State School

Western Downs Region
Localities in Queensland